Frank Sigel Dietrich (January 23, 1863 – October 2, 1930) was a United States circuit judge of the United States Court of Appeals for the Ninth Circuit and previously was a United States district judge of the United States District Court for the District of Idaho.

Education and career

Dietrich was born near Ottawa, Franklin County, Kansas in 1863, at the Dietrich Cabin. His parents had immigrated to the United States from the German Confederation (now Germany) in 1855, and his father, Jacob Dietrich, became a farmer. Jacob Dietrich died less than one year after the birth of his son Frank, whose name was chosen to honor American Civil War general Franz Sigel. Dietrich received an Artium Baccalaureus degree from Brown University in 1887 and an Artium Magister degree from that institution in 1890. He taught Latin, history, and political science at Ottawa University in Kansas, and read law to enter the bar in 1891, and was an attorney for the Union Pacific Railroad from 1899 to 1907.

Federal judicial service

Dietrich received a recess appointment from President Theodore Roosevelt on March 19, 1907, to a seat on the United States District Court for the District of Idaho vacated by Judge James H. Beatty. He was nominated to the same position by President Roosevelt on December 3, 1907. He was confirmed by the United States Senate on December 17, 1907, and received his commission the same day. His service terminated on January 18, 1927, due to his elevation to the Ninth Circuit.

Dietrich was nominated by President Calvin Coolidge on December 22, 1926, to a seat on the United States Court of Appeals for the Ninth Circuit vacated by Judge Wallace McCamant. He was confirmed by the Senate on January 3, 1927, and received his commission the same day. His service terminated on October 2, 1930, due to his death of a heart attack in Boise, Idaho. Dietrich and his wife Martha (1873–1958) are buried at Morris Hill Cemetery in Boise.

Honor

The town of Dietrich in rural Lincoln County, Idaho was named after him shortly after he became a federal judge.

References

External links
 
 

1863 births
1930 deaths
Judges of the United States District Court for the District of Idaho
United States district court judges appointed by Theodore Roosevelt
Judges of the United States Court of Appeals for the Ninth Circuit
United States court of appeals judges appointed by Calvin Coolidge
20th-century American judges
United States federal judges admitted to the practice of law by reading law
People from Ottawa, Kansas